Tarek M. Sobh is an Egyptian American professor of Electrical Engineering and Computer Science. He was the former Dean of the College of Engineering, Business, and Education of the  University of Bridgeport and he is the current president of Lawrence Technological University.

Education
He obtained his first degree, B.Sc. in Engineering in Computer Science and Automatic Control from the Alexandria University, Egypt in 1988. He obtained his M.Sc  and Ph.D.  in Computer and Information Science from University of Pennsylvania in 1989 and 1991.

Career
From 1992-1995 he was a research Assistant Professor of Computer at the University of Utah.  He was an associate professor at the University of Bridgeport between 1995-1999. In 2000 he became a professor at the same institution.

Fellowship and membership 
He is a fellow of Association for Computing Machinery, the Institute of Electrical and Electronics Engineers, the International Society for Optical Engineering (SPIE), the National Society of Professional Engineers (NSPE), the American Society of Engineering Education (ASEE), the American Association for the Advancement of Science (AAAS), the Society of Manufacturing Engineers (SME), the International Association of Online Engineering (IAOE), the Bridgeport Discovery Museum, the Connecticut Pre-Engineering Program (CPEP), and the International E-Learning Association (IELA).

References

Egyptian scientists
Egyptian academic administrators
Alexandria University alumni
University of Pennsylvania alumni
Year of birth missing (living people)
Living people
Fellows of the African Academy of Sciences